Davidson Township may refer to:
Davidson Township, Iredell County, North Carolina, United States
Davidson Township, Sullivan County, Pennsylvania, United States

See also
Davison Township, Michigan, United States
Davidson (disambiguation)